Auxilia palatina (sing. auxilium palatinum) were infantry units of the Late Roman army, first raised by Constantine I as part of the new field army he created in about 325 AD.

Some of the senior and probably oldest of these units had special names such as Cornuti or Brachiati; others were named after the tribes from which they were recruited (many of these in eastern Gaul, or among the German barbarians).  These units all became palatine units when a distinction was drawn between palatina and the remainder of the comitatenses around 365. There is no direct evidence for the strength of an auxilium, but A.H.M. Jones (History of the Later Roman Empire, Blackwell, Oxford, 1964 p 682) estimates that it may have been 600 or 700. Some auxilia are attested as limitanei, especially on the Danube.  It is not clear whether these were regarded as a different category of unit.

List of auxilia palatina
List of the auxilia palatina included in the early 5th-century Notitia Dignitatum, which depicts also some of the shield patterns of the units.

 Attacotti
 Batavi seniores
 Batavi iuniores
 Cornuti seniores
 Cornuti iuniores
 Brachiati seniores
 Celtae seniores
 Heruli seniores
 Heruli iuniores
 Mattiaci seniores
 Mattiaci iuniores
 Petulantes seniores
 Ascarii seniores
 Ascarii iuniores
 Iovii seniores
 Sagittarii Nervii
 Leones seniores
 Leones iuniores
 Exculcatores seniores
 Sagittarii Tungri
 Exculcatores iuniores
 Tubantes
 Salii
 Grati
 Felices seniores
 Felices iuniores
 Gratianenses seniores
 Invicti seniores
 Augustei
 Iovii iuniores
 Victores iuniores
 Bructeri
 Ampsivarii
 Gratianenses iuniores
 Valentianenses iuniores
 Raeti
 Regii
 Sequani
 Sagittarii venatores
 Latini
 Sabini
 Brachiati iuniores
 Honoriani Atecotti seniores
 Honoriani Marcomanni seniores
 Honoriani Marcomanni iuniores
 Honoriani Atecotti iuniores
 Brisigavi seniores
 Brisigavi iuniores
 Celtae iuniores
 Invicti iuniores Britanniciani
 Exculcatores iuniores Britanniciani
 Felices Valentinianenses
 Mattiaci iuniores Gallicani
 Salii Gallicani
 Sagittarii Nervii Gallicani
 Iovii iuniores Gallicani
 Seguntienses
 Galli victores
 Honoriani victores iuniores
 Honoriani ascarii seniores
 Felices iuniores Gallicani
 Atecotti iuniores Gallicani
 Tungri
 Honoriani Gallicani
 Mauri tonantes seniores
 Mauri tonantes iuniores
 Mauri Osismiaci
 Mauri Cetrati
 Mauri Vneneti
 Honoriani Mauri seniores
 Honoriani Mauri iuniores

Further reading 

A. Alföldi, 'Cornuti: A Teutonic Contingent in the Service of Constantine the Great and its Decisive Role in the Battle at the Milvian Bridge', Dumbarton Oaks Papers 13 (1959) 169-183.
M. Colombo, 'Constantinus rerum nouator: dal comitatus dioclezianeo ai palatini di Valentiniano I', Klio 90 (2008) 124–161.
D. Hoffmann, Das spätrömische Bewegungsheer und die Notitia Dignitatum ([Epigraphische Studien 7.1-2] Düsseldorf 1969–70).
M.J. Nicasie, Twilight of Empire: The Roman Army from the Reign of Diocletian until the Battle of Adrianople (Amsterdam 1998).
O. Schmitt, 'Stärke, Struktur und Genese des comitatensischen Infanterienumerus', Bonner Jahrbücher 201 (2001 [2004]) 93-111.
M.P. Speidel, 'Raising New Units for the late Roman army: auxilia palatina''', Dumbarton Oaks Papers 50 (1996) 163-170.
M.P. Speidel, 'The Four Earliest Auxilia Palatina', Revue des Études Militaires Anciennes 1 (2004) 132-46.
C. Zuckerman, 'Les "Barbares" romains: au sujet de l’origine des auxilia tétrarchiques' in M. Kazanski and F. Vallet (eds.), L'Armée romaine et les barbares du IIIe au VIIe siècles'' (Paris 1993) 17- 20.